Manowar Kills is Manowar's first compilation album. It was released in 1992.

Track listing
"The Demon's Whip" (Retail - Radio Edit) - 6:23
"Ride the Dragon" - 4:30
"Metal Warriors" - 3:59
"Fighting the World" - 3:46
"Kings of Metal" - 3:43
"Defender" - 6:01
"Black Wind, Fire and Steel" - 5:17
"Blood of the Kings" - 7:29

1992 compilation albums
Manowar albums
Atlantic Records compilation albums
Albums with cover art by Ken Kelly (artist)